The Johnston-Muff House, also known as the Charles Algermissen House, is a historic house in Crete, Nebraska. It was built in 1885 for John R. Johnston, an immigrant from Canada and homesteader who "built several commercial buildings for rental purposes" in Crete. In 1892, it was acquired by Catherine Hier Muff, an immigrant from Prussia and recent widow of John Muff, an immigrant from Switzerland. The house was designed in the Queen Anne architectural style. It has been listed on the National Register of Historic Places since September 19, 1977.

References

	
National Register of Historic Places in Saline County, Nebraska
Queen Anne architecture in Nebraska
Houses completed in 1885